The 2001–02 season was the 123rd season in Bolton Wanderers F.C.'s existence, and was their first season back in the top-flight after a Three-year absence. It covers the period from 1 July 2001 to 30 June 2002.

Season summary
Three wins from their first three Premiership games put newly promoted Bolton on top of the table, and manager Sam Allardyce was boasting (tongue-in-cheek) that his side were capable of winning their first-ever league title, but the strong start to the season was not followed up and in the end they finished 16th, just enough to avoid relegation.

First-team squad
Squad at end of season

Left club during season

Reserve squad

Transfers

In

Out

Loan in

Loan out

Results

FA Premier League

Results per matchday

FA Cup

League Cup

Statistics

Appearances
Bolton used a total of 35 players during the season.

Top scorers

References

 

2001-02
Bol